László Csongrádi (born 5 July 1959) is a Hungarian fencer, who won a gold medal in the team sabre competition at the 1988 Summer Olympics in Seoul together with György Nébald, Bence Szabó, Imre Bujdosó and Imre Gedővári.

References

External links
Csongrádi László on the website of Hungarian Olympic Committee (in Hungarian)

1959 births
Living people
Hungarian male sabre fencers
Fencers at the 1988 Summer Olympics
Olympic fencers of Hungary
Olympic gold medalists for Hungary
Olympic medalists in fencing
Medalists at the 1988 Summer Olympics
Universiade medalists in fencing
Universiade silver medalists for Hungary
Medalists at the 1985 Summer Universiade
Fencers from Budapest